The ABCs of Death  film series, consists of American-produced, multilingual horror-comedy anthology movies created in independtent filmmaking collaboration with various countries; including two limited-theatrical releases, and one straight-to-consumer video on demand spin-off movie.

Created from an original story concept by producer Ant Timpson, the plot centers around a variety of anthological explorations of horror and death. Through the series, writers and directors create a segment centered around one of the letters of the alphabet, with the studios allowing creative freedom to each of the filmmakers (including which word they chose to explore with their given letter), once they were assigned their segment. The resulting film series includes a diversity in cultures, languages, content, and subgenres within horror.

The film series as a whole has been met with a variety of classifications from film critics; the original film was met with mixed critical reception, while the second installment was more well received overall. The third released movie was similarly met with mixed reception from critics, though it was acknowledged as fitting the praiseworthy aspects of the previous two films. Though the box office numbers for the series were not considered as well as expected, Timpson later stated that the series had made enough monetary income through video on demand to justify continuing to develop additional installments.

Films

The ABCs of Death (2012)

Released as an anthology film, featuring segments depicting various subgenres of horror that were directed by twenty-six of what the studio described as "the world's leading talents" in contemporary indie-filmmaking. With a premise inspired by ABC educational children's books, the movie is made up of twenty-six individual segments directed by a different director, who was assigned a specific letter of the alphabet; and given the task do develop a story and film a short that explores a death associated with that letter of the alphabet. The studio allowed each director creative freedom in choosing the word, and developing the segment around their choice. The result includes provocative, shocking, and comedic exploration of the reality of death. The film depicts the range of diversity within the modern horror movie genre.

Fangoria described the product as: "a stunning roll call of some of the most exciting names in horror across the world." Producer Ant Timpson later stated that the movie made a significant amount of income from video on demand (VOD) means, though he nor the studios would reveal those financial figures.

ABCs of Death 2 (2014)

Following the financial success of the first installment, the producers created another feature-length anthology film which includes twenty-six more segments depicting various horrific deaths. Inspired alongside the rest of the film series by the "ABC's" in children's literature, each filmmaker was assigned a letter of the alphabet and given creative control over the story and creation of the associated short. The studio once again touted "over two dozen of the world's leading talents in contemporary genre film", with the announcement of the project. Each segment explores a different aspect of death, through a variety of subgenres of horror through the styles of independent filmmaking.

Though the movie was met with much more critical praise than the first installment, the film suffered greatly financially due to the illegal pirating. Producer Ant Timpson would state in later years that the movie made enough income through VOD figures, to continue the film series.

ABC's of Death 2½ (2016)

In July 2016, it was announced that another installment in the film series would be released. Described as a spin-off from the previous two entries, the project would explore the 26 best submissions out of 541 that the studio had received from independent filmmakers for ABCs of Death 2. For the first two movies, the associated studios held competitions for fans to submit their own creations, to be featured in the film series. In 2012, the featured selection was "T is for Toilet", while "M is for Masticate" was released in 2014. For the new spin-off movie, the producers decided to compile their selection of the top twenty-six submitted shorts for the featured letter "M" segment, of the second movie. Executive producer, Ant Timpson stated: "These are who we think are the next filmmakers to break out...That [was] the goal of the competition."

ABC's of Death 2  was described as separate from a planned third installment, and critics described the result as a mixed bag of product created by runners-up of the prior competition. The variety of segments once again explore various genres and styles of horror, all centered around a designated letter of the alphabet. Independent filmmakers created the stories and shorts with creative freedom, choosing the word that starts with the letter "M" associated with death, that they wanted the segment to center around. Ant Timpson and Tim League who served as producers on the first two feature films, served as executive producers for this straight-to-consumer release. Though the series continued to fare better critically by its second installment, it suffered a monetary loss due to the large amount of pirated viewings it received. As a response to this, Drafthouse Films chose to release 2  through Vimeo where it could be rented for $2.99 or purchased at $5.99 total. Timpson would also clarify that the first two movies were financially successful through VOD means, and was a factor in their decision to release the spin-off in a similar fashion; albeit the revenue earned through the release, would see Drafthouse split the income with Vimeo.

Potential sequel

During the final clip of the end credits to ABCs of Death 2, a teaser statement for a third installment read as: "ABCs of Death 3: Teach Harder, coming 2016". Despite the successes of the previous two movies, producer Ant Timpson stated in March 2015 that the box office performance of the second film was affected dramatically by pirated viewings. At that time, the producer stated that he and Tim League were looking at the financial figures, and will approach Magnolia Pictures to continue working on the project. When ABC's of Death 2  was released in 2016 it was described as a spin-off, while the introductory statement of the film clarifies that it "is not the ABCs of Death 3", indicating that the third movie was still in development at that time.

Cast and characters

Additional crew and production details

Reception

Box office performance

Critical and public response

Notes

References 

Horror film series
Film franchises introduced in 2012